Apterichtus anguiformis, the slender finless eel, is a species of snake eel (family Ophichthidae). It was described by Wilhelm Peters in 1877. It is a marine, subtropical eel which is known from the eastern Atlantic Ocean, including the western Mediterranean Sea, Morocco, and Cape Verde.

References

anguiformis
Fish described in 1877
Taxa named by Wilhelm Peters